Ål Station is a railway station located at Ål, Norway. The station is served by up to six daily express trains operated by Vy Tog. The station was opened as part of the Bergen Line between Bergen and Gulsvik in 1907.

On 1 November 1930, the restaurant was taken over by Norsk Spisevognselskap. In 1948, they erected a separate restaurant building at the station.

References

External links

 Jernbaneverket's page on Gol

Railway stations in Buskerud
Railway stations on Bergensbanen
Railway stations opened in 1907
1907 establishments in Norway
Ål